Juris Silovs (born 27 January 1973 in Dobele) is a Latvian former professional racing cyclist. He ended his professional career on 30 June 2001. He competed in the road race at the 1996 Summer Olympics, and finished in 31st place.

Major results 

1996
 1st Stage 5 Teleflex Tour
1997
 1st  National Road Race Championships
 1st Stage 7 Teleflex Tour
 1st Stage 4 Regio-Tour
 1st Stage 1 Hofbrau Cup
 5th National Time Trial Championships
1998
 1st  National Road Race Championships
 2nd National Time Trial Championships
 4th Scheldeprijs
 5th Cholet-Pays de Loire
1999
 2nd National Road Race Championships
 2nd Cholet-Pays de Loire
 6th Gent–Wevelgem
 6th National Time Trial Championships
 6th Scheldeprijs
 7th Veenendaal–Veenendaal
 8th Overall Tour de l'Oise
 10th E3 Harelbeke
2001
 2nd National Road Race Championships

References 

Latvian male cyclists
1973 births
Living people
People from Dobele
Olympic cyclists of Latvia
Cyclists at the 1996 Summer Olympics